"Alberto" is the eleventh episode of the fifth and final series of the period drama Upstairs, Downstairs. It first aired on 16 November 1975 on ITV.

Plot
It is June 1927, and Lady Prudence accompanies James to Royal Ascot, and they stay down there for five days. Edward, who is Under Butler while Hudson is in Berlin with Lord and Lady Bellamy, goes with them.

Meanwhile, Lady Dolly Hale invites round Paul Marvin, a film maker, to see Georgina. Marvin arranges for Georgina to star in one of his films, Paris by Night. Lady Dolly takes a liking to Frederick, and they soon become secret lovers. When James returns from Ascot and he dislikes the idea of Georgina starring in a film, and is worried when she tells him he is going for a costume fitting alone with Marvin. However, James and Lady Prudence go to the film studio to see Georgina's scene, unbeknownst to her. However, Lady Dolly has planned for Frederick, who is also in the film, and Georgina to have to kiss in the scene. Both Georgina and Frederick are unaware of this until the scene is about to be filmed, and when James see he is furious and shouts at Lady Dolly, who has come to watch. Frederick then leaves, as do James and Lady Prudence. Georgina stays, but Marvin advises she go back to her dressing room.

When James and Lady Prudence get back to Eaton Place, James admits that he is jealous when Georgina has fun, and Lady Prudence correctly guesses that he is in love with Georgina. Shortly after, an unrepentant Frederick gives in his notice, which a furious James accepts. Frederick then leaves the same day, telling the other servants that he has seen a new life for himself, starring in films and going out with rich women.

Cast
Simon Williams - James Bellamy
Joan Benham - Lady Prudence Fairfax
Angela Baddeley - Mrs Bridges
Jean Marsh - Rose
Lesley-Anne Down - Georgina Worsley
Christopher Beeny - Edward
Gareth Hunt - Frederick
Jacqueline Tong - Daisy
Madeline Cannon - Lady Dolly Hale
Seymour Green - Paul Marvin
Rowland Davies - Assistant Director

Background
The Understudy was recorded in the studio on 15 and 16 May 1975. This episode marks the final appearance of Gareth Hunt as Frederick Norton.

Footnotes

References
Richard Marson, "Inside UpDown - The Story of Upstairs, Downstairs", Kaleidoscope Publishing, 2005
Updown.org.uk - Upstairs, Downstairs Fansite

Upstairs, Downstairs (series 5) episodes
1975 British television episodes
Fiction set in 1927